In physics, a Killing horizon is a geometrical construct used in general relativity and its generalizations to delineate spacetime boundaries without reference to the dynamic Einstein field equations. Mathematically a Killing horizon is a null hypersurface defined by the vanishing of the norm of a Killing vector field (both are named after Wilhelm Killing). It can also be defined as a null hypersurface generated by a Killing vector, which in turn is null at that surface.

After Hawking showed that quantum field theory in curved spacetime (without reference to the Einstein field equations) predicted that a black hole formed by collapse will emit thermal radiation, it became clear that there is an unexpected connection between spacetime geometry (Killing horizons) and thermal effects for quantum fields. In particular, there is a very general relationship between thermal radiation and spacetimes that admit a one-parameter group of isometries possessing a bifurcate Killing horizon, which consists of a pair of intersecting null hypersurfaces that are orthogonal to the Killing field.

Flat spacetime 
In Minkowski space-time, in pseudo-Cartesian coordinates  with signature  an example of Killing horizon is provided by the Lorentz boost (a Killing vector of the space-time)

 

 

Therefore,  is null only on the hyperplanes of equations

 

Black hole Killing horizons 
Exact black hole metrics such as the Kerr–Newman metric contain Killing horizons, which can coincide with their ergospheres.  For this spacetime, the corresponding Killing horizon is located at

 

In the usual coordinates, outside the Killing horizon, the Killing vector field  is timelike, whilst inside it is spacelike.  

Associated with a Killing horizon is a geometrical quantity known as surface gravity, .  If the surface gravity vanishes, then the Killing horizon is said to be degenerate. 

Cosmological Killing horizons 

References

General relativity
Mathematical physics